Reinaldo García Zapata is the current governor of Havana, in Cuba. Garcia Zapata was elected governor of the city/province of Havana on January 18, 2020. He previously held the title of President of the People's Power Provincial Assembly of Havana (mayor).

García replaces Marta Hernández Romero, who left office in January 2020.

References

1968 births
Living people
People from Havana
Cuban politicians